Simply Sweets is an album by trumpeter Harry Edison with saxophonist Eddie "Lockjaw" Davis recorded in 1977 and released by the Pablo label the following year.

Reception

AllMusic reviewer Scott Yanow stated "Trumpeter Harry "Sweets" Edison and tenor saxophonist Eddie "Lockjaw" Davis always made a potent pair. They both possessed immediately identifiable sounds, were veterans of Count Basie's Orchestra and never had any difficulty swinging. The repertoire of this Edison album is not too creative  ... However, the playing of the principals holds one's interest throughout".

Track listing
All compositions by Harry Edison except where noted
 "Dirty Butt Blues" – 6:36
 "Feelings" (Morris Albert) – 5:21
 "One for the Count" – 5:27
 "My Ideal" (Richard A. Whiting, Leo Robin, Newell Chase) – 5:42
 "Simply Sweets" – 4:24
 "Opus Funk" – 6:52
 "Lax" – 3:19
 "Miz Kitty's Blues" – 7:50

Personnel 
Harry Edison – trumpet
Eddie "Lockjaw" Davis – tenor saxophone
Dolo Coker – piano
Harvey Newmark – bass
Jimmie Smith – drums

References 

1978 albums
Harry Edison albums
Eddie "Lockjaw" Davis albums
Pablo Records albums
Albums produced by Norman Granz